Henri Milne-Edwards (23 October 1800 – 29 July 1885) was an eminent French zoologist.

Biography
Henri Milne-Edwards was the 27th child of William Edwards, an English planter and colonel of the militia in Jamaica and Elisabeth Vaux, a Frenchwoman. Henri was born in Bruges, in present-day Belgium, where his parents had retired; Bruges was then a part of the newborn French Republic. His father had been jailed for several years for helping some Englishmen in their escape to their country. Henri spent most of his life in France. He was brought up in Paris by his older brother Guillaume Frederic Edwards (1777–1842), a distinguished physiologist and ethnologist. His father was released after the fall of Napoleon. The whole family then moved to Paris.

At first he turned his attention to medicine, in which he graduated as an MD at Paris in 1823. His passion for natural history soon prevailed, and he gave himself up to the study of the lower forms of animal life. He became a student of Georges Cuvier and befriended Jean Victoire Audouin.

He married Laura Trézel. They had nine children, including the biologist Alphonse Milne-Edwards.

Name
Originally the name Milne was one of the first names of Henri, but, to avoid confusion with his numerous relatives, he added it to his surname Edwards. He usually wrote it as "Milne Edwards", whilst his son Alphonse always used "Milne-Edwards". In taxon-authorship, the hyphenated name "Milne-Edwards" is most often used for both father and son.

Works

One of his earliest papers, which was presented to the French Academy of Sciences in 1829, formed the theme of an elaborate and eulogistic report by Cuvier in the following year. It embodied the results of two dredging expeditions undertaken by him and his friend Audouin during 1826 and 1828 in the neighbourhood of Granville, and was remarkable for clearly distinguishing the marine fauna of that portion of the French coast into four zones.

Also in 1829, working in the scientific field of herpetology, he described and named five new species of lizards.

In 1862 he succeeded Isidore Geoffroy Saint-Hilaire in the long-vacant chair of zoology.

Much of his original work was published in the Annales des sciences naturelles, with the editorship of which he was associated from 1834.

In 1842, he was elected a foreign member of the Royal Society. The Royal Society in 1856 awarded him the Copley Medal in recognition of his zoological investigations. He was elected an international member of the American Philosophical Society in 1860. He died in Paris. His son, Alphonse Milne-Edwards (1835–1900), who became professor of ornithology at the museum in 1876, devoted himself especially to fossil birds and deep-sea exploration.

An important early classification scheme for vertebrates, diagrammed as a series of nested sets, was illustrated in Milne-Edwards (1844).

Honour

The name of Henri Milne-Edwards is honoured in several names of genera and species, such as:

Edwardsia de Quatrefages, 1841
Edwardsiella Andres, 1883
Henricia J. E. Gray, 1840
Myrianida edwardsi (de Saint-Joseph, 1887)
Lophoura edwardsi Kölliker, 1853
Aristaeopsis edwardsiana (Johnson, 1868)
Plesionika edwardsii (Brandt, 1851)
Dynamene edwardsi (Lucas, 1849)
Grapsicepon edwardsi Giard & Bonnier, 1888
Glossocephalus milneedwardsi Bovallius, 1887
Onisimus edwardsii (Krøyer, 1846)
Diastylis edwardsi (Krøyer, 1841)
Neoamphitrite edwardsii (de Quatrefages, 1865)
Colpaster edwardsi (Perrier, 1882)
Milnesium Doyère, 1840
Jasus edwardsii (Hutton, 1875)
Odontozona edwardsi (Bouvier, 1908)
Milneedwardsia Bourguignat, 1877
Boeckosimus edwardsii (Krøyer, 1846)
Lithophyllon edwardsi (Rosseau, 1850)
Goniastria edwardsi Chevalier, 1971
Fedora edwardsi Jullien, 1882
Ciona edwardsi (Roule, 1886)
Maasella edwardsi (de Lacaze-Duthiers, 1888)
Forskalia edwardsi Kölliker, 1853
Costa edwardsii (Roemer, 1838)
Colobomatus edwardsi (Richiardi, 1876)
Salmincola edwardsi (Olsson, 1869)
Aristaeopsis edwardsianus (Johnson, 1867)
Sergestes edwardsii Krøyer, 1855
Odontozona edwardsi (Bouvier, 1908)
Alphaeus edwardsii (Audouin, 1826)
Ebalia edwardsii Costa, 1838
Fedora edwardsi Jullien, 1882
Teuchopora edwardsi (Jullien, 1882)
Calliostoma milneedwardsi Locard, 1898
Ocinebrina edwardsii Payraudeau, 1826
Discodoris edwardsi Vayssière, 1902
Tergipes edwardsii Nordmann, 1844
Sadayoshia edwardsii (Miers, 1884)
Periclimenes edwardsi (Paulson, 1875)
Ocenebra edwardsi Payraudeau, 1826
Conus milneedwardsi F. P. Jousseaume, 1894
Montipora edwardsi Bernard, 1879
Goniastrea edwardsi Chevalier, 1971
Pagurus edwardsi (Dana, 1852)
Chirostylus milneedwardsi (Henderson, 1885)
Pisoides edwardsi Bell, 1835
Cancer edwardsi Bell, 1835
Diogenes edwardsii (de Haan, 1849)
Propithecus edwardsi (A. Grandidier, 1871)
Archaeoniscus edwardsii (Westwood, 1854)

References

Bibliography
Marcelin Berthelot, Notice historique sur Henri Milne Edwards, Didot, Paris 1891.
Trevor Norton: Stars beneath the sea, Carroll & Graf, New York 2000.

External links
 
 

1800 births
1885 deaths
French taxonomists
French carcinologists
French ornithologists
Grand Officiers of the Légion d'honneur
Recipients of the Copley Medal
Members of the French Academy of Sciences
Members of the Royal Swedish Academy of Sciences
Foreign associates of the National Academy of Sciences
Foreign Members of the Royal Society
Recipients of the Pour le Mérite (civil class)
French people of English descent
Scientists from Bruges
19th-century French zoologists
National Museum of Natural History (France) people
Presidents of the Société entomologique de France